Anori is a municipality located in the Brazilian state of Amazonas. Its population was 21,477 (2020) and its area is 5,795 km².

The municipality contains 40.11% of the  Piagaçu-Purus Sustainable Development Reserve, established in 2003.

References

Municipalities in Amazonas (Brazilian state)
Populated places on the Amazon